Massimiliano Barbone (born 12 July 1991) is a former Italian footballer who plays as a defender.

In 2012, he was signed by S.S. Chieti Calcio.

References

External links
 

1991 births
Living people
People from Ortona
Italian footballers
Association football defenders
A.C. Giacomense players
Delfino Pescara 1936 players
S.S. Ebolitana 1925 players
Sportspeople from the Province of Chieti
Footballers from Abruzzo